Cosmonauts Alley is a wide avenue in northern Moscow leading to the Russian Memorial Museum of Cosmonautics and the Monument to the Conquerors of Space. The pedestrian-only avenue connects the museum and monument to the VDNKh subway station.

Monuments 
Yuri Gagarin
Valentina Tereshkova
Pavel Belyayev
Alexei Leonov
Vladimir Komarov
Valentin Glushko
Mstislav Keldysh
Sergey Korolyov
Konstantin Tsiolkovsky
Valentin Lebedev
Svetlana Savitskaya
Alexander Alexandrov
Vladimir Solovyov

Gallery

References 

Streets in Moscow
Outdoor sculptures in Russia
Soviet and Russian space program locations
History of spaceflight
Monuments and memorials built in the Soviet Union
Tourist attractions in Moscow
Monuments and memorials to Yuri Gagarin
Alexei Leonov
Monuments and memorials to explorers
Monuments and memorials in Moscow
Cultural heritage monuments of federal significance in Moscow